Saperda alberti is a species of beetle in the family Cerambycidae. It was described by Nikolay Nikolaevich Plavilstshchikov in 1916. It is known from Japan, North Korea, China, Mongolia, and Russia.

References

alberti
Beetles described in 1916